Lakewood High School is a public primary school located in Lakewood, Colorado, United States. It is part of Jefferson County Public Schools. Lakewood was ranked as the 11th best school in the nation by Newsweek in 2006, and as the 10th in 2008.

History

Lakewood High School was established in 1928 at 7655 W 10th Avenue in Lakewood, with elementary and junior high schools on the same campus. The high school moved to its current location at 9700 W. 8th Avenue in summer 1958, and the previous site became the location of the Jefferson County Open School in 1989.

As a result of a bond issue on the 2004 ballot, Lakewood received over $35 million to construct a new school building. Construction began in January 2006 and continued until summer 2007, when the new building had its official opening. It opened for classes at the beginning of the 2007-2008 school year, with students sometimes assisting teachers in moving in.

Spoon Game 
Beginning in 2010, Lakewood High School upperclassmen participated in a student-organized tag-based game, called "The Spoon Game," in which students attempt to eliminate each other by tagging them with a spoon. Each entrant in the Spoon Game pays a fee, which is then distributed to the Junior and Senior winner at the end of the year, along with a charitable donation. The game begins early in the second semester of each year with simple rules. A player is vulnerable if they are not holding a spoon, and may be eliminated by the player with their target card. As the end of the school year nears, the game's rules become more complex, increasing eliminations until only one player remains. Since its inception, the Spoon Game has been played every year except 2020, when the game was cancelled due to the COVID-19 pandemic.

2013 Good Morning America appearance
After entering a competition held by the tv show Good Morning America in fall 2013, Lakewood High School won a live concert put on at the high school on October 25, 2013. The high school made a lip-dub video to pop star Katy Perry's song "Roar" from the album Prism. The video the high school submitted for the competition gained 2 million views on Vimeo and another 300,000 on YouTube in the first day it was posted. In a selection announced live on the show on October 13, 2013, Perry chose the video from over 1,000 entries from high schools in 44 states. The concert took place in the high school's gymnasium and was not open to the public.

Academics
Lakewood has both honors and Advanced Placement programs. It is also an International Baccalaureate World School, and offers the IB Prep and IB Diploma program, starting when students begin high school.

Lakewood High is ranked by 5280 magazine as one of the top high schools in the metro area.

Music program

Instrumental Music
Lakewood High School has a symphonic band, a wind ensemble, and a percussion ensemble in its concert band program. Lakewood also has a string orchestra program with a concert orchestra, a symphonic orchestra and a chamber orchestra.  Lakewood High School's marching band is called the Bengal Regiment.  It is the school's largest instrumental ensemble.

Choral music
Lakewood High School has five choral music ensembles: a men's choir; a women's choir; Kaleidoscope, an elite women's choir; Eclipse, an advanced men’s and women’s mixed choir; and Encore, an a capella ensemble.

Athletics
The softball team won two consecutive 4A Colorado High School Activities Association (CHSAA) state championships, in 1997 and 1998.

The boys' football team was runner up in 2011.

The boys' golf team tied for second place in the state tournament in 2014. Lakewood is a CHSAA Class 5A school.

The boys' soccer team were the Jefferson County 5A League champions in the spring of 2021 after the 2020 fall season had been delayed due to the COVID-19 pandemic.

Notable people
 Keli McGregor, pro football player and administrator (student)
 Edward Tipper, decorated World War II veteran (teacher)
 James J. Heckman, Henry Schultz Distinguished Service Professor of Economics at the University of Chicago; Winner of The Sveriges Riksbank Prize in Economic Sciences in Memory of Alfred Nobel 2000
 Kayln Heffernan, rapper, activist, 2019 Denver mayoral candidate (student)

References

External links
School website

Public high schools in Colorado
Educational institutions established in 1928
Jefferson County Public Schools (Colorado)
Education in Lakewood, Colorado
International Baccalaureate schools in Colorado
Schools in Jefferson County, Colorado
1928 establishments in Colorado